Familial may refer to:
Familial (album), a 2010 studio album by Phil Selway
Family,   a group of people affiliated by consanguinity, affinity, or co-residence
Family (biology), one of the eight major taxonomic ranks, classified between order and genus
Heredity, passing of genetic traits to offspring
Genetic disorder, more specifically
List of genetic disorders

See also 
 
 
Family (disambiguation)